Iliria College (Iliria Royal University, Albanian: Kolegji Iliria) is a private provider of higher education in Kosovo. The Iliria Kolleg Pristina began its activity in 2001 as a private institution which combines the Albanian educational tradition with contemporary concepts. The Iliria College is member of the Balkan Universities Network.

As of 2013, it is accredited by the Kosovo Accreditation Agency to offer courses in computer science, business, and law.

Notes

References

External links
Official Website of Iliria College

Universities and colleges in Kosovo
Buildings and structures in Pristina
Education in Pristina